Frank Wells (21 October 1871 – 14 January 1932) was a New Zealand cricketer. He played two first-class matches for Otago between 1895 and 1897.

See also
 List of Otago representative cricketers

References

External links
 

1871 births
1932 deaths
New Zealand cricketers
Otago cricketers
Cricketers from Dunedin